Eilema aurantioflava is a moth of the  subfamily Arctiinae. It is found on Sumbawa.

References

aurantioflava